Marcus Alexander Browne (born 18 December 1997) is an English professional footballer who plays as a midfielder for Oxford United. A product of the West Ham United youth academy, he can play in a central attacking midfield role and can also operate on both wings.

Early life
Browne was born in Tower Hamlets of Dominican descent.

Club career

West Ham United
Browne joined West Ham United at the age of 8 and progressed through the academy at the club prior to signing his first professional contract on 12 November 2015.

On 18 August 2016, Browne made his senior debut in a Europa League fixture against Astra Giurgiu. The game finished 1–1 and Browne replaced Gökhan Töre in the 75th minute. After making a tackle in the middle of the pitch, Browne ran for around  before passing to teammate Michail Antonio before the right winger missed a clear chance to score.

On 20 January 2017, Browne joined struggling Championship club Wigan Athletic on loan until the end of the season. He made his debut and only appearance on 29 January, where he came on as a second-half substitute in their 4–0 FA Cup defeat to Premier League giants Manchester United. Wigan went on to suffer relegation to League One at the end of the divisional campaign.

On 24 July 2018, Browne joined established League One club Oxford United on a season-long loan. He made his league debut, coming on as a substitute, during a 2–0 home defeat to Fleetwood Town, their second game of the season. Browne scored his first goal for Oxford in a convincing 2–0 win against Coventry City on 14 August, in the first round of their EFL Cup campaign. His first league goal, which was referred to as a "superb solo goal", came in a 3–2 home defeat to Accrington Stanley a week later.

By the end of the season, Browne had scored 9 goals in 44 appearances throughout all competitions, 6 of which occurred in his 34 divisional appearances.

Middlesbrough
On 26 July 2019, Browne signed a four-year deal with Championship club Middlesbrough for an officially undisclosed transfer fee.

Browne re-joined Oxford United on 9 January 2020 on a loan deal until the end of the 2019–20 season.

Oxford United 
In January 2022 Browne signed a two and a half-year contract with Oxford United for an undisclosed fee. Browne's contract included the option of an extra 12 months.

Style of play
Oxford United manager Karl Robinson praised the player upon his arrival at the club, stating, "He is technically very good, he sees a pass and will score goals so he is very talented and we know there were a lot of clubs chasing him."

Upon his arrival at the Teesside-based club, Middlesbrough manager Jonathan Woodgate stated, "Marcus is an exciting, hungry young player who wants to come and play for this football club. He's just what we need. He can play in three different positions and he is quick. I watched a lot of games for Oxford last season and he's not only the type of player we want here, but he's also the type we can improve, and he will get better."

Career statistics

References

External links

1997 births
Living people
English footballers
Footballers from the London Borough of Tower Hamlets
Black British sportsmen
Association football midfielders
West Ham United F.C. players
Wigan Athletic F.C. players
Oxford United F.C. players
Middlesbrough F.C. players
English Football League players